Triclonella philantha is a moth in the family Cosmopterigidae. It is found in Peru.

References

Natural History Museum Lepidoptera generic names catalog

Cosmopteriginae
Moths of South America
Moths described in 1920